Locrian may refer to:

Locrians, an ancient Greek ethnic group
Locrian Greek, ancient Greek dialect spoken by the Locrians
Locris, the territory of the Locrians

In music:
Locrian mode, a musical mode or diatonic scale
Major Locrian scale, the scale obtained by sharpening the second and third degrees of the locrian mode
 Locrian sharp 2 or Half diminished scale, a musical scale commonly used in jazz and some rock
 Locrian (band), Chicago-based experimental music duo

Language and nationality disambiguation pages